New York in the '70s is a concept album by British alternative rock artist Luke Haines. The music style is influenced by new wave and protopunk bands from the New York scene mostly by Suicide (band).

Into his song "Cerne Abbas Man", he refers Rock and Roll Animals in the sentence The birds were in my last LP.

Concept
The concept is less of a narrative story and more of a descriptive album. As the title tells, Haines describes some scenes from New York City in 1970s art world. Talking about social context, drug use, sexual liberty.

Following his two last albums, Haines namedropping a bunch of people as Lou Reed, Jim Carroll, Bill Cunningham, Jimi Hendrix, all the members of The New York Dolls and few others. 
The band Suicide seems to have a huge influence on the album from its style, but also as Alan Vega is referred to in the first and last track. The song City Drone sounds a lot like the band's style as well as UK Punk that sounds specifically like Suicide's Rocket U.S.A. The link can also make by the comparaison of "UK" vs "U.S.A." diminutives.

He also refers to iconic places such as Chelsea Hotel, CBGB, The Kitchen#History etc.

Track listing
All tracks written and composed by Luke Haines except for track 9 by John Moore.
 "Alan Vegas Says" – 3:17
 "Drone City" – 2:55
 "NY in the 70s" – 2:39
 "Jim Carroll" – 1:48
 "Tricks n Kicks n Drugs" – 2:10
 "Bill's Bunker" – 3:28
 "Dolls Forever" – 2:32
 "New York City Breakdown" – 1:38
 "Lou Reed Lou Reed" – 2:06
 "UK Punk" – 3:13
 "Cemes Abbas Man" – 4:11
 "NY Stars" – 3:22

Credits
Music
 Luke Haines – guitar, keyboards, drums, vocals, songwriting

Production
 Luke Haines – producer
 Ed Woods – mastering

Visual
 Siân Pattenden – photography
 Luke Haines – painting
 Louise Mason - Sleeve, Layout

2014 albums
Luke Haines albums
Cherry Red Records albums